Rails (Italian: Rotaie) is a 1929 Italian drama film directed by Mario Camerini and starring Käthe von Nagy, Maurizio D'Ancora and Daniele Crespi. It was originally made as a silent film, but sound was later added. It was made at a time when the Italian film industry had dramatically declined in size, and was one of only a handful of films released that year.

Cast
 Käthe von Nagy as La ragazza  
 Maurizio D'Ancora as Giorgio  
 Daniele Crespi as Jacques Mercier 
 Giacomo Moschini as Un amico di Jacques al casinò 
 Mario Camerini as Un giocatore all roulette 
 Carola Lotti as La ragazza bionda al casinò

References

Bibliography 
 Clarke, David B. & Doel, Marcus A. Moving Pictures/Stopping Places: Hotels and Motels on Film. Lexington Books, 2009.

External links 
 

1929 films
Italian drama films
1929 drama films
1920s Italian-language films
Films directed by Mario Camerini
Transitional sound films
Italian black-and-white films
1920s Italian films